Lysander (died 395 BC) was a military general of ancient Sparta.

Lysander may also refer to:

People
Lysander (given name), list of people and fictional characters with this name
Lysander (Shakespeare), character in Shakespeare's A Midsummer Night's Dream
Lysander Spooner (1808 – 1887), early American entrepreneur and legal theorist
Albert Lysander (1875–1956), Swedish Lutheran priest
Rick Lysander (born 1953), American professional baseball pitcher

Military
HMS Lysander, several ships of the British Royal Navy
Westland Lysander, British military aircraft of the 1930s and 1940s

Places
Lysander, New York

Locomotives 
 GWR 4073 "Castle" Class No.5079 "Lysander"

See also
 Lysander (boat)
Lysandre (disambiguation)